Kossi Noutsoudje (born 16 October 1977) is a retired Togolese football striker. He was a squad member for the 1998 African Cup of Nations.

References

1977 births
Living people
Togolese footballers
Togo international footballers
Ashanti Gold SC players
ASEC Mimosas players
ASFA Yennenga players
Association football forwards
Togolese expatriate footballers
Expatriate footballers in Ghana
Togolese expatriate sportspeople in Ghana
Expatriate footballers in Ivory Coast
Togolese expatriate sportspeople in Ivory Coast
Expatriate footballers in Burkina Faso
Togolese expatriate sportspeople in Burkina Faso
21st-century Togolese people